The Lovejoy District is a neighborhood in Buffalo, New York. Lovejoy is the easternmost portion of the city, running along the city's border with Cheektowaga. The councilman of the area in 2017 is Richard Fontana.

Lovejoy is named after Sarah Lovejoy, an American killed in December 1813 during a British-Indian raid on Buffalo during Niagara Frontier warfare of the War of 1812.

Ethnicity
As Buffalo developed as an industrial city, Lovejoy became a destination for European immigrants and later, migrants from the rural South. In the 1830s, it was a primarily German neighborhood. With later demographic changes and immigration from southern and eastern Europe, it became a neighborhood of Italians. In the 20th century, African Americans and Hispanics moved in as well. The most recent 21st-century arrivals have been Arab and Asian, reflecting changing immigration patterns. The neighborhood is still dominated numerically by Italian Americans.

Schools
PS #43 is the primary school in the East Lovejoy area, which many student-age children attend. It has architectural and significant history.  Started in 1831 by Joseph Churchyard, the man who owned the land, the school created an annex on East Lovejoy and Benzinger streets.  This is the current school #43.  Built to accommodate 600 ethnic German children living in the area, the school had 49 classrooms, two gymnasiums, a cafeteria, and other features.  In 1926, the number of students attending was 1,662.
Recently, the school underwent a $56 million construction project; another building was constructed on the former parking lot and connected to the old one. PS 43 is now one of the Buffalo Public Community Schools.

St. Agnes Catholic parish school operated in Lovejoy for about 100 years before its close in 2009. The diocese did not have the funds for needed upgrades. It opened in the 1800s.

Parks
Among the many parks in the Lovejoy area are Hennipin Park, the main and largest park, including a recently redone community center; Davey Park, and Moreland Field.

Iron Island
"Iron Island" is a popular nickname for the area of Lovejoy that is almost entirely surrounded by train tracks (Tracks run along William Street, Broadway, many go through the Buffalo Central Terminal, and across William Street).  The area also had a CSX building located on N. Ogden Street, which was destroyed in a large fire in July 2012.

References

See also
Neighborhoods of Buffalo, New York

Neighborhoods in Buffalo, New York